Mike Spivey may refer to:

 Michael Spivey (born 1960), British computer scientist
 Mike Spivey (law school administration), American administrator
 Mike Spivey (American football) (born 1954), American football player